The Promenade at Howard Hughes Center is a two-level outdoor mix-used center that features a blend of entertainment, dining, and shopping venues located at the Howard Hughes Center in Westchester and adjacent to Playa Vista  both Westside Los Angeles districts in the city of Los Angeles, California. It is also close to the Fox Hills district in Culver City.

The mall is located on Sepulveda Boulevard beside the San Diego Freeway (Interstate 405), one of the major freeways in Los Angeles with over 297,000 motorists passing daily.

History
The Promenade at Howard Hughes Center opened in 2000. It originally featured The Bridge Cinema De Lux, a luxury movie theater with IMAX screens, several restaurants including Johnny Rockets, Islands, On The Border, Subway and Starbucks, plus a Nordstrom Rack, and Borders Books and Music. The movie theater was eventually purchased by Rave Cinemas and operated under the Rave banner until the theater was one of the 32 locations that was purchased by Cinemark in 2012, but the theater still retained Rave logo until 2015 when it was renovated to be one of Cinemark's flagship theaters, featuring 18 screens, some featuring Cinemark XD. The center was popular around its opening but over the years lost popularity due to its proximity to Westfield Culver City, and it lost some of its big tenants including Borders which closed in 2011 due to the chains liquidation, and Nordstrom Rack which relocated to Westfield Culver City in 2013. On The Border closed and was replaced by Souplantation until it closed in 2017. It did however, manage to attract new tenants to fill some of the vacant space including Buffalo Wild Wings, Dave & Busters, and Kabuki Japanese Restaurant. The Laurus Corp. acquired the Howard Hughes Center, including The Promenade, in 2015. Laurus announced plans for a large-scale residential expansion, remodeling, and overhaul designed by the Jerde Partnership.

The center is part of the  Howard Hughes Center business campus, that includes buildings for mixed use office, retail, and health care tenants. Neighbors include a Pepperdine University satellite campus, and headquarter corporations such  as Universal Studios, Univision, and Sony.

See also

References

External links
 

Shopping malls on the Westside, Los Angeles
Westchester, Los Angeles
Westside (Los Angeles County)
Sepulveda Boulevard
Shopping malls established in 2000
2000 establishments in California